A mechitza (partition or division, pl.:) in Judaism, is a partition, particularly one that is used to separate men and women.

The rationale in halakha (Jewish law) for a partition dividing men and women is derived from the Babylonian Talmud. A divider in the form of a balcony was established in the Temple in Jerusalem for the Simchat Beit HaShoeivah ceremony, a time of great celebration and festivity. The divider was first established to preserve modesty and attention during this time.

During the mid-20th century, a substantial number of Orthodox synagogues did not have mechitzot. However, the Orthodox Union (OU), the main body of Modern Orthodox synagogues in the United States, adopted a policy of not accepting as new members synagogues without mechitzot, and strongly encouraged existing synagogues to adopt them. Men and women are generally not separated in most Conservative synagogues, but it is a permissible option within Conservative Judaism; some Conservative synagogues, particularly in Canada, have separate seating for men and women, with or without a physical partition. Reform congregations, consistent with the movement's core value of gender equality, do not use mechitzot in their synagogues.

Origin

Talmudic era
Although the synagogue mechitza is not mentioned anywhere in Talmudic literature, there is a discussion of a barrier between men and women, used at the Sukkot festivities in the Jerusalem Temple. The Amoraic sage Rav explains that the divider originated with a statement of the prophet Zechariah regarding the mourning following the war between Gog and Magog:

Rav explained that if such a sad occasion necessitates a separation between men and women, then the Simchat Beit HaShoeivah in the Temple in Jerusalem (a very happy occasion) does as well.

Medieval period
Meir of Rothenburg (13th century, Germany) is reported to have had a separate women's section in his synagogue.

Shlomo ibn Aderet (13th century, Spain) mentions a women's section in synagogue.

The Yu Aw Synagogue in Afghanistan, built in 1393, has a separate women's gallery.

Separate seating in synagogue
A mechitza most commonly means the physical divider placed between the men's and women's sections in Orthodox synagogues and at religious celebrations. The idea behind this is twofold. First, mingling of the sexes is generally frowned upon, as this leads to frivolity, which itself may lead to promiscuity. Secondly, even if the sexes are separated, they should not be able to interact to a high degree during a religious service, lest this lead to gazing and impure thoughts. Due to these restrictions, mechitzot are usually opaque (at least looking from the men's side to the women's side).

In some synagogues, the mechitza divided the front and back of the synagogue. In others it divides the left and right sides of the synagogue. The latter is often seen as more equal, since the women are not farther away from the service than the men.

The women's section of the synagogue is called the Ezrat Nashim (women's courtyard) after a similar area in the Temple in Jerusalem. In Ashkenazic European synagogues, the women's section or annex was called the weibershul. Historically, the weibershul was led by a Firzogerin, a learned woman who would translate the Hebrew liturgy of the main service led by the chazzan into the vernacular. 

Orthodox Judaism is divided on whether a synagogue mechitza represents binding law or a custom. During the middle portion of the 20th century, there were a substantial number of synagogues which considered themselves Orthodox but did not have one. The influential Haredi Posek (decisor) Moshe Feinstein held that a mechitza is required as a matter of Biblical law, holding that the statement in Zechariah 12:12-14 represents not a prophecy about future circumstances but binding Sinaitic law, Halacha LeMoshe MiSinai, regarding present circumstances. He declared that Orthodox Jews are prohibited from praying in a synagogue without one. Rabbi Joseph Soloveitchik held that a separation of men and women is Biblically required, while the physical mechitza was required by Rabbinic decree. These views have gained adherence over the later portion of the 20th century.

The Orthodox Union (OU), the main body of Modern Orthodox synagogues in the United States, adopted a policy of not accepting synagogues without mechitzot as new members, and strongly encouraging existing synagogues to adopt them. In 2002, Rabbi Avi Weiss of Yeshivat Chovevei Torah, stated that "As an Orthodox institution, Yeshivat Chovevei Torah requires its students to daven in synagogues with mechitzot." The Jewish Ledger reported that as of 2005, "Beth Midrash Hagadol-Beth Joseph remains the only synagogue in the country affiliated with the Orthodox Union (OU) to have so-called 'mixed seating.'" However, in 2015 this synagogue decided to leave the OU, after learning that the OU was planning to expel it from OU membership. Mixed-seating Orthodox synagogues (Conservadox), which were a prevalent minority as late as a generation ago, have now all but disappeared. The partnership minyan movement, which seeks a greater synagogue role for women within an Orthodox context, requires a mechitza.

The Union for Traditional Judaism recently published a viewpoint arguing that a mechitza is not required to have a particular height by either Biblical law or rabbinic decree.

Men and women are generally not separated in most Conservative synagogues, although it is a permissible option within Conservative Judaism and some Conservative synagogues, particularly in Canada, have one or have separate seating for men and women without a physical partition. Conservative Judaism takes the position that the Mechitza referred to in Talmud Tractate Sukkah applied only to the festival of Sukkah in the Temple and that its use to separate men and women for synagogue worship and other occasions represents a custom rather than a requirement of core Jewish law, and is subject to contemporary Rabbinic re-examination. Some Conservative synagogues (e.g. in Europe and Israel) also have a meḥitza or separate seating sections for men and women without a physical partition. At one point the synagogue in the Jewish Theological Seminary did so.

Reform and Reconstructionist Judaism, consistent with their view that traditional religious law is not mandatory in modern times and a more liberal interpretation of gender roles, do not use mechitzot in their synagogues. This development is historically connected with the United States; the original German Reform retained the women's balcony, although the "curtain or lattice-work" was removed. (Even in Orthodoxy there is a dispute as to whether a balcony requires a curtain.)

It has been argued that abolition of the mechitza became a symbol of Reform Judaism and that, correspondingly, opposition to its abolition became a symbol of Orthodoxy.

Proper height of synagogue mechitza

There are different views on the proper height of a mechitzah separating men and women in a synagogue. Differences about minimum mechitza height represent a source of disagreement between more liberal or Modern and more Ḥaredi Orthodox Jews. According to the Shulchan Aruch HaRav, used by Chabad-Lubavitch, a mechitza needs to prevent men from seeing a woman who might be immodestly dressed, and hence a mechitza needs to be as tall as a man, or 6 feet. However, according to Orthodox Rabbi Ahron Soloveichik, a mechitzah need only serve as a halakhic partition, and hence need only be the minimum height for such a partition. Rabbi Soloveichik holds that this height is 10 tefachim (about 32 inches).

These differences reflect a general philosophical difference between Haredi Judaism, which emphasizes strict interpretations in order to prevent possible transgressions, and Modern Orthodox Judaism, which is more likely to utilize leniencies rooted in classical rabbinic sources. The difference has tended to increase the social distance between Haredi and Modern Orthodox Jews, as Haredi Jews who follow the stricter interpretation may find themselves unable to pray in some Modern Orthodox synagogues. As a result, and consistent with the general increasing influence of Haredi interpretations, many synagogues in recent years have raised the height of their mechitzot in order to accommodate members and guests who follow stricter interpretations.

In order to accommodate stricter interpretations and provide a way for women to see, many synagogues will make an opaque wall that is 3–4 feet high and add a lattice, screen, one-way glass, or other semi-transparent material above that opaque wall. The design shown above is an example of that design: The etched glass is semi-transparent, while the opaque wall adheres to what the synagogue requires as the minimum height requirement. The Or Torah synagogue in Skokie, Illinois has a similar design.

Mechitza designs
There are different styles of mechitzas, depending on the number of women the synagogue expects to attend their prayer services, how dedicated the congregation is to accommodating women who wish to pray with the congregation, and whether the congregation believes that the purpose of the mechitza is to provide a social separation or to prevent the men from seeing the women.

Any of these options can be made so that they go across the length of the room so that men and women are side-by-side or so that they go across the width of the room so that women sit behind the men. Synagogues in which women sit next to the men are generally more concerned with women's ability to join equally in prayer with the congregation.

Balcony Balconies with a three-foot wall are themselves traditionally considered fitting mechitzas. In this design, women sit in the balcony and men sit below. This design was common in the 19th and early 20th century, and is common in Europe, including the Shaarei Tikva synagogue in Lisbon (opened in 1904). Examples in the United States include the Bnei Israel Synagogue in Baltimore (opened 1845), B'nai Jacob in Ottumwa, Iowa (opened 1915), Temple Beth Shalom (the Tremont Street Shul) in Cambridge, Massachusetts (opened 1925 as Temple Ashkenaz), and the Beth Efraim Bukharian Jewish Synagogue in Forest Hills, New York (70th Avenue). Some of these American examples are modeled after specific European synagogues, others are best classified as vernacular architecture. A Canadian example is the Beth Jacob Synagogue in North York, Ontario.
 Balconies with curtains or one-way glass More strict congregations add a curtain to the balcony so that men cannot see even women's faces.
 Central partition A fixed-height gate or planter running down the center of the room, so that women and men both face front side by side. Often these partitions are minimal height (3 feet). In addition to the partition, sometimes the women's section is elevated by about a foot above the men's section. Example of a lower partition with a raised floor is in Anshe Shalom Bnei Israel synagogue in Chicago and Young Israel of Ocean Parkway in Flatbush, Brooklyn. An example of a medium-high partition without a raised floor is the Adas Israel in Hamilton, Ontario. An example of a higher partition with a raised floor is in Mount Sinai Jewish Center of Washington Heights in Manhattan.
 Booth Synagogues that expect very few women to attend provide a token space that can accommodate about six women comfortably. Examples are in the Yeshiva University beit midrash, and the Shabbat afternoon service at Young Israel of Avenue J in Flatbush, Brooklyn. In some synagogues, the booth is a supplement to the balcony, to accommodate women who have difficulty walking up the stairs (such as at She'erith Israel Congregation, Glen Avenue, Baltimore).
 Fixed-height opaque wall Sometimes with a non-opaque curtain, screen, glass, or other material above the wall, which can include: blinds or a curtain that can be opened during announcements or a sermon, etched glass, stained glass, a one-way screen with lights so that women can see through without being seen (e.g. Beth Jacob Shaarei Zion and Suburban Orthodox in Baltimore).
 The mechitza at the Bostoner Rebbe's synagogue in Brookline, Massachusetts, is made entirely of panels from the Boston John Hancock Tower (which had been removed from that building due to safety concerns). The Bostoner Rebbe chose these panels because they are one-way glass so the women can see out, but men cannot see into the women's section. Later, the Rebbe's wife put curtains inside the women's section, so that women could not see into the men's section.)
This option costs less than the above fixed options and is used frequently by synagogues that wish to use their prayer halls for mixed-sex functions in addition to separate sex prayer. College Hillel Orthodox minyans may choose this option because the rooms at Hillel are all used for multiple purposes besides prayer.
 Separate room The strictest separation has women in a separate room from the men, able to view through one-way glass or an open window from a balcony, or not view at all. Examples of this are the yeshiva Ohr Someach in the neighborhood of Maalot Dafna in Jerusalem, where the men sit in a first floor room with a two-story ceiling, and the women are on the second floor with a window overlooking the men's prayer hall. A similar design (men first floor, women second floor) is in 770 Eastern Parkway, the main synagogue for the Chabad Lubavitch movement in Crown Heights, Brooklyn, and the Main Belzer Shul in Jerusalem.

Uses unrelated to gender separation

Eruv

In halakhic discourse, "mechitza" can also refer to the boundary walls of an eruv for carrying (to carry within a given area on the Sabbath the area must be entirely enclosed). There are many specific rules for what constitutes a valid mechitza, although the mechitza does not have to be solid. (For example, there are many instances where part of an eruv may be a string run across several poles, and this could constitute a valid mechitza).

Sukkah
The walls of a sukkah are also referred to as a "mechitza" in the Talmud. These walls must be at least ten tefachim (approximately 32") high for the sukkah to be valid.

See also

 Gender separation in mosques
 Gender separation in Judaism

Footnotes

References
Alkalay-Gut, Karen. Mechitza. Cross-Cultural Communications, 1986. 
Goldman, Karla. Beyond the Synagogue Gallery: Finding a Place for Women in American Judaism. Harvard University Press, 2000. 
Goodman, Marina. Why Should I Stand Behind the Mechitzah if I Could Be a Prayer Leader? Targum, 2003. 
Litvin, Baruch (Editor). The Sanctity of the Synagogue: The Case for Mechitzah-Separation Between Men and Women in the Synagogue-Based on Jewish Law, History, and Philosophy. Ktav Publications Inc. 1987.

External links

Jewish law and rituals
Sex segregation and Judaism
Synagogue architecture
Eruvin
Hebrew words and phrases in Jewish law